Alistair Ian Campbell (born 15 February 1959) is an English singer and songwriter who was lead singer of the British reggae band UB40. As part of UB40, Campbell sold over 70 million records worldwide and toured the globe for 30 years. In 2008, Campbell left UB40 due to a dispute with band management and embarked on a solo career. In 2012, Campbell was announced as one of the three judges on the panel of the TV show New Zealand's Got Talent. In August 2014, Campbell announced he had reunited with former UB40 bandmates Astro and Mickey to record a new album, Silhouette, released on 6 October 2014.

Early life
Alistair Ian Campbell was born in Birmingham, England.  He is the brother of former bandmate Robin Campbell and former UB40 frontman Duncan Campbell, and is a son of the late Scottish folk singer Ian Campbell.

Departure from UB40
In October 2007, Campbell released a solo album titled Running Free. It entered the UK Albums Chart at number 9 and went gold. This was the first top ten entry for Campbell for a new studio album since UB40s Labour of Love 3 album, which was released 10 years prior.

On 24 January 2008, it was reported that Campbell was to quit the group after almost 30 years. Campbell, who was a founding member of UB40, songwriter and lead vocalist, finally quit the band in 2008. Their last gigs together were in February 2008 in Australia, New Zealand and Uganda.

Campbell then issued a statement on his website and through his solicitors stating that for many years he had been unhappy with the business practices and business managers of UB40 and launched an investigation into the financial handling of the business. This was the reason for his departure.

A few months later, Michael Virtue the keyboard player also left UB40, citing the same reasons as Campbell, and joined Campbell's legal investigation.  Virtue subsequently joined Campbell's new band, the Dep band.

Solo career
In the UK, his solo albums Big Love and Running Free both reached the UK Top 10, while Flying High and Great British Songs reached the Top 20. Campbell scored a number 1 hit in 1994 as featured artist, along with brother Robin, on Pato Banton's cover of The Equals' "Baby Come Back".

On 18 October 2010 Ali released his fourth solo album Great British Songs—a collection of British pop and rock hits from the 1960s and 1970s. The album reached 15 on the UK Albums Chart where it remained for three weeks. It also gave Campbell his third top 15 charting album in as many years. Critic David Jefferies of AllMusic said of the album, "Longtime fans will appreciate that Campbell's voice is as strong as ever, but it deserves a better showcase than this mixed bag". Campbell's label Jacaranda Music was number one on the UK independent chart in October 2010 and Great British Songs also entered the iTunes reggae album chart at number one.

In 2012, Campbell was announced as one of the three judges on the judging panel of the TV show, New Zealand's Got Talent, along with Jason Kerrison and Rachel Hunter. In 2013, Campbell was replaced for the third series by American choreographer Cris Judd.

UB40 featuring Ali Campbell
In August 2014, Campbell announced that he had reunited with former UB40 bandmates Astro and Mickey Virtue to record a new album, Silhouette. He said of his brother Duncan's singing, "I sat back for five years and watched my brother Duncan murdering my songs. We're saving the legacy". They initially toured under the name 'UB40 featuring Ali, Astro and Mickey', leading to legal action brought by the other UB40. Their first release was The Hits of UB40 Live in 2015. In 2016, their Unplugged album reached number 17 on the UK Albums Chart. A Real Labour of Love was released in March 2018, an album much in the vein of UB40's Labour of Love series. It reached number two on the UK Albums Chart, and entered the Billboard Reggae Albums chart at number one. Virtue departed the band in late 2018, following which the band has operated under the name 'UB40 featuring Ali Campbell and Astro'. In July 2021, vocalist Matt Hoy quit the band, while on 6 November 2021, the group's social media announced that Astro had died after a short illness. In 2022, the first single from the band's final album with Astro, "Sufferer" was released, which was joined in the countdown as shown on The Heritage Chart Show by Matt Hoy's solo single "We Are One", a fact which was picked up by presenter Mike Read on the programme broadcast on Talking Pictures TV on 10 April 2022. On 17 June 2022, UB40 featuring Ali Campbell and Astro will release the album Unprecedented via UMC, with Campbell fulfilling his UB40 tour dates in the run-up to the album's release, with the tour now billed as being 'in memory of Astro'.

Awards and nominations
Whilst with UB40, Campbell received an Ivor Novello Award for International Achievement.
At the 2007 Grammy Awards, UB40 were nominated for best reggae album of 2006.
Mauritius Government award to Ali Campbell for his services to Music and Charity – December 2010

Personal life
Campbell is the father of eight children, including two with his current wife, Julie.

Discography

Solo albums
Big Love (1995) UK No. 6
Running Free (2007) UK No. 9
Flying High (2009) UK No. 13
Great British Songs (2010) UK No. 15

Solo singles
"That Look in Your Eye" (1995) (with Pamela Starks) UK No. 5, AUS No. 80
"You Can Cry on My Shoulder" (1995) (Japan only release)
"Let Your Yeah Be Yeah" (1995) UK No. 25
"Somethin' Stupid" (1995) (with Kibibi Campbell) UK No. 30
"Hold Me Tight" (2007)
"Would I Lie To You" (2007) (with Bitty McLean)
"Running Free" (2008) (with Beverley Knight)
"Out From Under" (2009)
"Carrie Anne" (2010)
"Waitin'" (2010) (with Los Pericos)

UB40 featuring Ali Campbell
Silhouette (as Ali Campbell - The Legendary Voice Of UB40 - Reunited With Astro & Mickey) Cooking Vinyl, 2014 (UK No. 18) 
The Hits of UB40 Live (as UB40 featuring Ali, Astro & Mickey)  Estupendo, 2015
Unplugged + Greatest Hits (as UB40 featuring Ali, Astro & Mickey, with disc 2 featuring original UB40 recordings), UMC, 2016 (UK No. 17)
A Real Labour of Love (as UB40 featuring Ali, Astro & Mickey) UMC, 2018 (UK No. 2)
Unprecedented (as UB40 featuring Ali and Astro) UMC, 2022 (UK No. 8)

References

Further reading
Ali Campbell interview by Pete Lewis, 'Blues & Soul' July 2010

External links

1959 births
Living people
English male singer-songwriters
English reggae musicians
Ivor Novello Award winners
Musicians from Birmingham, West Midlands
UB40 members
English people of Scottish descent
Cooking Vinyl artists